Hot Spell is a 1958 American drama film directed by Daniel Mann, starring Shirley Booth and Anthony Quinn, and released by Paramount Pictures.

Plot
Alma Duval is a Louisiana housewife planning a 45th birthday celebration  for her husband John Henry, known to all as Jack, who is carrying on with a much younger woman named Ruby behind her back. Her adult children try to tell her this but she refuses to face reality and denies their claims.

During the birthday dinner, Jack picks an argument with eldest son, Buddy, mocking him about his business ideas and daring him to show some backbone. No one touches the birthday cake Alma made.  After the dinner breaks up, he takes teenaged son Billy out to play pool and drink beer, trying to demonstrate to him how a man ought to behave. Jack confides in Billy that he is not content with his life and makes Billy cry. Jack tells Billy to stop crying and to act like a man.

Later in the evening, Alma shares some of the cake with her neighbor, Fan, while Fan tries to convince her to take up smoking and casual drinking to impress Jack.

While her father dallies with Ruby, his 19-year-old mistress, Virginia Duval becomes lovers for the first time with boyfriend Wyatt, a medical student, who then says he cannot marry her because he needs to be with someone of greater position and wealth.

Throughout the movie, Alma has been holding onto a belief that if she can move the family back to New Paris where she and Jack started out, everything will be all right. But Jack refuses to return to New Paris after admitting he never truly loved her. Alma slaps Jack after discovering his affair. He decides to leave her and move to Florida, but while enroute Ruby forces him to drive the car too quickly. As it crashes into construction signs Jack yells Alma's name and he and Ruby are promptly killed in the crash.

Alma and her children return to New Paris to bury Jack and she realizes that people and places have changed and there is no happiness to be found there anymore. The family goes home, with Alma still denying reality by deciding to travel to Florida, stating it will bring her happiness as it is the "land of eternal sunshine".

Cast
Shirley Booth as Alma Duval
Anthony Quinn as John Henry "Jack" Duval
Shirley MacLaine as Virginia Duval
Earl Holliman as John Henry "Buddy" Duval Jr.
Eileen Heckart as Alma's friend Fan
Clint Kimbrough as Billy Duval
Warren Albert Stevens as Virginia's boyfriend Wyatt
Jody Lawrance as Dora May
Harlan Warde as Harry
 Valerie Allen as Ruby

Production
The screenplay for Hot Spell was developed from an unproduced play by Lonnie Coleman, Next of Kin, purchased by producer Hal Wallis in June 1956. Production occurred from January 23 to early March 1957, with filming in Pasadena and Chatsworth, California.

Release
Hot Spell had its premiere in New Orleans on May 21, 1958, and went into wide release in June.

Bosley Crowther of The New York Times gave it a moderately good review, singling out Booth, Quinn, and MacLaine for their portrayals.

In pop culture
During the 2010 film Valentine's Day, Estelle and Edgar Paddington (played by MacLaine and Héctor Elizondo) reunite at a showing of Hot Spell at the Hollywood Forever Cemetery. Edgar points to MacLaine on the screen and tells Jason Morris (played by Topher Grace), "that's my trifecta".

See also
 List of American films of 1958

References

External links

1958 films
1958 drama films
Adultery in films
American black-and-white films
American drama films
American films based on plays
Films directed by Daniel Mann
Films produced by Hal B. Wallis
Films scored by Alex North
Films set in New Orleans
Films with screenplays by James Poe
Paramount Pictures films
1950s English-language films
1950s American films